The following is a list of episodes of the Disney Channel sitcom, Hannah Montana, created by Michael Poryes, Rich Correll and Barry O'Brien. The series debuted on March 24, 2006. The program centers on Miley Stewart (portrayed by Miley Cyrus), a teenage girl living a double life as famous pop singer Hannah Montana, where she conceals her real identity from everyone else except for her family and a few close friends.

The fourth season premiered on July 11, 2010 and ended on January 16, 2011 with a one-hour series finale. During the series' run, 98 episodes of the series aired.

Series overview

Episodes

Season 1 (2006–07)

Season 2 (2007–08)

Season 3 (2008–10)

Season 4: Forever (2010–11)

Ratings

See also
 List of That's So Raven episodes - includes "Checkin' Out", part one of 'That's So Suite Life of Hannah Montana' crossover
 List of The Suite Life of Zack & Cody episodes - includes "That's So Suite Life of Hannah Montana", part two of crossover with the same name
 List of Wizards of Waverly Place episodes - includes "Cast-Away (To Another Show)", part one of 'Wizards on Deck with Hannah Montana' crossover
 List of The Suite Life on Deck episodes - includes "Double-Crossed", part two of 'Wizards on Deck with Hannah Montana' crossover

References 

Hannah Montana
Hannah Montana
Hannah Montana